The Criminal Justice Act 1948 is an Act of the Parliament of the United Kingdom.

Overview

It is "one of the most important measures relating to the reform of the criminal law and its administration". 

It abolished:
penal servitude, hard labour and prison divisions for England and Wales (s.1). 
state punishment of whipping there and in Scotland (s.2). 
right of peers to be tried in the House of Lords (s.30).

Other substantive provisions still in force are:
 s. 27, as amended by (in particular) the Children and Young Persons Act 1969, which provides for remand of defendants between 18 and 20 years old to remand centres, and s. 49, which regulates them;
 s. 31(1), which gives English courts extraterritorial jurisdiction in respect of Crown servants committing indictable offences abroad while in the course of their duties;
 s. 37, relating to bail on appeal;
 s. 41, which makes certain kinds of evidence admissible via a signed certificate instead of oral submissions;
 s  42, on a procedural rule in cases on indictment;
 s. 66, partly defining "custody";
 s. 70(2), authorizing pensions to be paid notwithstanding disqualification from office under section 2 of the Forfeiture Act 1870 due to conviction for a crime.

Scottish and Northern Irish analogues
Some of its content is mirrored in the Criminal Justice (Scotland) Act 1949 and the Criminal Justice Act (Northern Ireland) 1953.

Partial repeal
The act was partially repealed in 1977; it was modernised and recast in Acts including the Criminal Law Acts 1977 and 1997.

See also
Criminal Justice Act
UK labour law

Notes

External links
The Criminal Justice Act 1948, as amended from the National Archives.
The Criminal Justice Act 1948, as originally enacted from the National Archives.

United Kingdom Acts of Parliament 1948
Criminal law of the United Kingdom

July 1948 events in the United Kingdom